Charles Li Xiaojia,  (born 25 March 1961) is a Chinese banker. He was the Chief Executive of the Hong Kong Exchanges and Clearing Limited (HKEX) from 2010 to 2021.

Biography
Li was born in 1961 and was an offshore oil worker in the north China sea prior to college. He became a newspaper editor-reporter for the China Daily from 1984 to 1986 and obtained a bachelor's degree in journalism from the Xiamen University in 1984 before he studied at the University of Alabama in which he was graduated with a master's degree in 1988. In 1991, he obtained a Juris Doctor degree from Columbia Law School.

After graduation, Li practiced law in New York with Davis Polk & Wardwell and Brown & Wood. He also began to work in the financial services sector, including in corporate and securities law practices, corporate finance and advisory services in New York, Mainland China and New York, and joined Merrill Lynch in 1994 and became president of Merrill Lynch China in 1999. He joined the JP Morgan Chase China and became its chairman in 2003. 

In 2015, the Wall Street Journal reported that Charles Li, while he was chairman of JP Morgan China from 2003 to 2009, recommended hiring the children and associates of Chinese officials, clients and potential future clients. At the time, JP Morgan was investigated by the US Securities and Exchange Commission and the US Department of Justice into possible violation of anti-bribery laws by improperly hiring relatives of Chinese officials, known as "princelings", to win business.

In 2010, Li was named Chief Executive of the Hong Kong Exchanges and Clearing Limited (HKEX). During his tenure, a mechanism called Stock Connect was created in 2014 for Mainland Chinese investors to trade shares listed in the Hong Kong stock market and international investors to trade shares listed in the stock markets of Shanghai and Shenzhen. In 2020, Li announced his retirement at the end of 2020. He officially stepped down on 1 January 2021.

Li is the co-founder of Micro Connect, a platform to link international capital to small businesses in China that has raised more than $70 million from investors such as Li Ka-shing and Adrian Cheng.

Li served as a trustee of Columbia University in the City of New York and is current a trustee of Columbia Global Centers, East Asia. He was also appointed a member of the governing council of the University of Hong Kong in 2020, serving a term for three years.

References

1961 births
Living people
Chinese journalists
Chinese bankers
Chinese chief executives
Businesspeople from Beijing
JPMorgan Chase people
Merrill (company) people
Hong Kong bankers
Hong Kong chief executives
Xiamen University alumni
University of Alabama alumni
Columbia Law School alumni
Members of the 13th Chinese People's Political Consultative Conference
Recipients of the Silver Bauhinia Star
Davis Polk & Wardwell lawyers